Orrori dell'Amore or Was hast du mit meinem Herz getan? is the original soundtrack of the film , written & directed by Irma Achten, produced by 'Kees Kasander and Dennis Wigman, with an orchestral songbook (orchestral lieder) for vocal soloists and chamber orchestra by Nicholas Lens.

Credits
Music & artistic producer: Nicholas Lens
Lyrics: Nicholas Lens - Irma Achten
Published by Schott Music International Mainz
Production: Tabaran Company
Soloists: Claron McFadden, soprano / Henk Lauwers, baritone / Gary Boyce, counter
Originally released by Sony BMG International SK 62016
Currently not distributed anymore

Use
"Was hast du mit meinem Herz getan?" (Mutter-Tour, 2001 and Live aus Berlin-Tour, 1998, Rammstein).
The 12th track from Nicholas Lens' Orrori dell'Amore called Was hast du mit meinem Herz getan? was used as outro-song by the German hard rock band Rammstein at the end of all concerts of the Live aus Berlin-Tour, 1998, the Mutter-Tour, 2001 and on the DVD and CD Live aus Berlin of Rammstein.
Marie Antoinette is niet dood (long feature film 1996)
Orrori dell'Amore is the soundtrack of the film "Marie Antoinette is not dead," written & directed by Irma Achten, produced by 'Kees Kasander / Dennis Wigman. The film premiered at the International Film Festival Rotterdam on July 4, 1996.

Track listing

1995 original release
Orrori dell'Amore (07:20)
The Desire for the Blue World (03:43)
La Generosita dei Vita (06:39)
The Alpenwaltz (03:12)
The Queen's Body (02:46)
Desiderando (06:27)
Waa wee (03:43)
Le Roi est Mort, Vive le Roi (04:10)
Les Paysannes Royales (03:11)
Ein adliches Geschlecht (05:58)
The Emperor (04:03)
Was hast du mit meinem Herz getan? (04:46)
Orrori dell'Amore (07:22)

References

Compositions by Nicholas Lens
1995 soundtrack albums
Sony International soundtracks
Cabaret albums